These are the official results of the Men's 5000 metres event at the 1980 Summer Olympics in Moscow, Soviet Union. There were a total number of 34 participating athletes, with the final held on Friday 1 August 1980.

Records
These were the standing world and Olympic records (in minutes) prior to the 1980 Summer Olympics.

Results

Final
 Held on Friday 1 August 1980
The only Soviet runner to qualify for this final, Alexander Fyodotkin, set a quick early pace, leading the field at 1,000 metres in 2:38.4.  At 1,100 metres, Ethiopia's Mohammed Kedir moved into the lead, slowing the pace in order to conserve his famous team mate Miruts Yifter's final kick power.  Kedir led the twelve-man group at 2,000 metres in 5:22.9 and at 3,000 metres in 8:08.1.  Finland's Kaarlo Maaninka took the lead just before 3,400 metres, slightly improving the pace.  However, all the twelve runners were still in contention at 4,000 metres, which Maaninka reached in 10:51.1.  After 4,300 metres, this race's third Ethiopian runner, Yohannes Mohammed, sprinted into the lead.  After 4,400 metres, Fyodotkin passed Mohammed.  On the second last home straight, Kedir returned to the lead.  At this point, the field began to break up, with Finland's Martti Vainio dropping from the lead group, and Czechoslovakia's Jirí Sýkora, Ireland's John Treacy and Austria's Dietmar Millonig having to struggle to remain in the lead group.  Kedir's informal 4,600-metre split was 12:25.89.  He led the field into the final back straight, but then Ireland's Eamonn Coghlan rushed into the lead.  Kedir and Mohammed moved outward, to give room to their famous team mate, Yifter, who then began his explosive final kick.  Accidentally Kedir and Mohammed collided on the final back straight, with Kedir falling and Mohammed stumbling badly.  Only Coghlan, Tanzania's Suleiman Nyambui, Switzerland's Markus Ryffel, and Finland's Kaarlo Maaninka were able to accelerate with Yifter.  Further behind, Millonig was passing runners and approaching Treacy and Fyodotkin.  On the final bend, Yifter began to pull away from Coghlan, while Nyambui passed the fading Irish runner.  At the end of the bend, Maaninka sprinted past Ryffel.  On the home straight, Yifter increased somewhat his lead over Nyambui, while Maaninka passed Coghlan to claim the bronze medal.  One second behind the Finn, Millonig passed Treacy and Fyodotkin.  Sýkora placed ninth, while Mohammed, Vainio and Kedir faded badly in the last 200 metres.  (The Great Olympic Book / Suuri Olympiateos, volume 3, Finland, 1980;  The Moscow Olympic Book / Moskovan olympiakirja, Finland, 1980;  four YouTube videos on this final.)

Semi-finals
 Held on Wednesday 30 July 1980

Heats
 Held on Monday 28 July 1980

See also
 1978 Men's European Championships 5000 metres (Prague)
 1982 Men's European Championships 5000 metres (Athens)
 1983 Men's World Championships 5000 metres (Helsinki)
 1986 Men's European Championships 5000 metres (Stuttgart)
 1987 Men's World Championships 5000 metres (Rome)

References

External links
 Results

 5
5000 metres at the Olympics
Men's events at the 1980 Summer Olympics